The 262 Southwest Anatolia earthquake devastated the Roman city of Ephesus along with cities along the west and south coasts of Anatolia in year 262, or possibly 261, on 21 December. The epicenter was likely located in the southern Aegean Sea. Reports note that many cities were flooded by the sea, presumably due to a tsunami.

Nicholas Ambraseys, who performed the most comprehensive assessment of ancient earthquakes in the Mediterranean, traces the original source of most literary references to this quake to an account in the Augustan History purportedly written by Trebellius Pollio. This source is problematic, as the veracity of much of its supposed biographical details is doubtful. However, there is some reason to give credence to the history's accounts of natural disasters. Trebellius's account also reports the southwest Anatolia earthquake in conjunction with one that hit Cyrene, Libya the same year. The two events appears to have been unrelated, but it has been difficult for historians to disentangle the exact effects of each based on the classical sources.

Tectonic setting

There are many faults in the Aegean Sea and the adjacent coastal areas of Anatolia, caused by the African Plate being subducted beneath the Aegean Sea Plate. These faults result in frequent earthquakes. Ephesus, which sustained considerable damage in the 262 AD earthquake, was also struck by earthquakes in AD 17, sometime before AD 30, c. AD 42, c. AD 46–47, c. 150–155, 358–366, 614, and the tenth or eleventh century. One fault in the southern part of the region stretches from the island of Rhodes in present-day Greece northeastwards to Burdur in present-day Turkey.

Damage
Trebellius wrote that the cities of Roman Asia reported the worst damage from the earthquake: "In many places the earth yawned open, and salt water appeared in the fissures. Many cities were even overwhelmed by the sea." He records that this damage occurred took place during the consulship of Gallienus and Fausianus. The latter appears to be Nummius Faustianus who was a consul in the year 262.

Much of the Library of Celsus at Ephesus (including all the books) were destroyed by fire in or around 262. The cause of the fire has been attributed either to this earthquake or to an invasion by the Goths (sometimes incorrectly identified as Scythians). Ephesus's Temple of Artemis, one of the Seven Wonders of the Ancient World, was also destroyed around the same date, although some sources attribute this to a Gothic invasion in 267 or 268. There is some archeological evidence at Ephesus supporting the date implied by Trebellius's account. Stefan Karwiese of the Austrian Archaeological Institute at Athens reports that ceramics found near the library and temple can be dated to the second half of the third century.

A study of geological processes in Roman cities concludes that 11 major buildings at Ephesus required rebuilding after the 262 earthquake: the terrace houses, Temple of Serapis (Serapeion), Stoa of Damianus, Harbor Baths (also known as the Great Baths or Baths of Constantius), Baths of Varius and Scholastica Baths, Magnesian Gate, Medusa Gate, Lower Agora (also known as the Tetragonos Agora), Library of Celsus, theatre and stadium.

Account by "Trebellius Pollio"
The Augustan History contains a biography of Gallienus titled "The Two Gallieni" and ascribed to Trebellius Pollio, likely a pseudonym. The writer appears to have been aiming to retrospectively malign the character of Gallienus. Among the descriptions of his frivolity and military defeats is a section that relates several natural disasters of the time. Romans frequently saw these as omens and it was not unusual to conflate several events from the same year.

See also
List of earthquakes in Turkey
List of historical earthquakes
List of historical tsunamis

References

Sources
 
 
 

262
260s in the Roman Empire
3rd-century earthquakes
Lydia
Caria
Lycia
3rd-century natural disasters
0262 Southwest Anatolia
Tsunamis in Turkey
Earthquakes in the Roman Empire